Local elections took place for one third of the seats of the thirty-six metropolitan boroughs on 1 May 1975. The seats had previously been contested in May 1973, when the Labour Party had achieved great success. In the 1975 elections the Conservative Party made widespread gains, with a net gain of 199 seats and Labour had a net loss of 206. The Liberal Party had a net loss of 10 seats, and Independents a loss of 5. "Others", including Ratepayers, Independent Labour councillors and Progressives made net gains of 22.

The Conservatives gained control of Bury, Stockport and Wirral from no overall control; and Calderdale form Labour. They also became the largest party on Leeds city council.

Labour retained control of Birmingham by the mayor's casting vote.

The Liberals failed to gain overall control of Liverpool, and losing seats, but remaining the largest party on the council by a single seat.

Summary of results

England

Metropolitan boroughs

References

Local elections 2006. House of Commons Library Research Paper 06/26.
Vote 1999 BBC News
Vote 2000 BBC News

 
1975
Local elections